Crematogaster aberrans is a species of ant in tribe Crematogastrini. It was described by Forel in 1892.

References

aberrans
Insects described in 1892